Cheung Sha Beach may refer to the following beaches in Cheung Sha, Hong Kong:

 Lower Cheung Sha Beach
 Upper Cheung Sha Beach